This list compiles many of the common large shrubs and trees found in Canada. The Canadian flora is depauperate because of the near total glaciation event in the Pleistocene. Due to the vast area of Canada, a tree that is common in one area may be completely absent in another. In particular, many warm-temperate trees can only be grown on the mild Pacific coast (where gardens may contain additional species not listed here).

See also Provincial tree emblems of Canada for the official trees of the Provinces and Territories of Canada.

Pinophyta (Conifers)
Abies (firs)
 Abies amabilis (Pacific Silver Fir)
 Abies balsamea (Balsam Fir)
 Abies bifolia (Rocky Mountains Subalpine Fir)
 Abies concolor (White Fir) - introduced
 Abies grandis (Grand Fir)
 Abies lasiocarpa (Coast Range Subalpine Fir)
 Abies magnifica (Red Fir) - introduced
 Abies nordmanniana (Nordmann Fir) - introduced
 Abies pinsapo (Spanish Fir) - introduced
 Abies procera (Noble Fir) - introduced

Araucaria
 Araucaria araucana (Monkey-puzzle) - introduced

Cedrus (cedars)
 Cedrus atlantica (Atlas Cedar) - introduced
 Cedrus deodara (Deodar Cedar) - introduced
 Cedrus libani (Lebanon Cedar) - introduced

Chamaecyparis
 Chamaecyparis lawsoniana (Lawson's Cypress) - introduced
 Chamaecyparis obtusa (Hinoki Cypress) - introduced
 Chamaecyparis pisifera (Sawara Cypress) - introduced

Cryptomeria
 Cryptomeria japonica (Sugi) - introduced

Cupressus
 Cupressus arizonica (Arizona Cypress) - introduced
 Cupressus macrocarpa (Monterey Cypress) - introduced

Juniperus (junipers)
 Juniperus chinensis (Chinese Juniper) - introduced
 Juniperus communis (Common Juniper)
 Juniperus horizontalis (Creeping Juniper)
 Juniperus sabina (Savin Juniper) - introduced
 Juniperus scopulorum (Rocky Mountain juniper)
 Juniperus virginiana (Eastern Juniper)

Larix (larches)
 Larix decidua (European Larch) - introduced
 Larix gmelinii (Dahurian Larch) - introduced
 Larix kaempferi (Japanese Larch) - introduced
 Larix laricina (Tamarack Larch)
 Larix lyallii (Subalpine Larch)
 Larix occidentalis (Western Larch)
 Larix sibirica (Siberian Larche) - introduced

Metasequoia
 Metasequoia glyptostroboides (Dawn Redwood) - introduced

Picea (spruces)
 Picea abies (Norway Spruce) - introduced
 Picea engelmannii (Engelmann Spruce)
 Picea glauca (White Spruce)
 Picea mariana (Black Spruce)
 Picea omorika (Serbian Spruce) - introduced
 Picea pungens (Colorado Spruce) - introduced
 Picea rubens (Red Spruce)
 Picea sitchensis (Sitka Spruce)

Pinus (pines)
 Pinus albicaulis (Whitebark Pine)
 Pinus aristata (Bristlecone Pine) - introduced
 Pinus banksiana (Jack Pine)
 Pinus contorta subsp. contorta Shore Pine 
 Pinus contorta subsp. latifolia Lodgepole Pine
 Pinus flexilis (Limber Pine)
 Pinus monticola (Western White Pine)
 Pinus mugo (Mountain Pine) - introduced
 Pinus nigra (European Black Pine) or Austrian Pine - introduced
 Pinus ponderosa (Ponderosa Pine)
 Pinus resinosa (Red Pine)
 Pinus rigida (Pitch Pine)
 Pinus strobus (Eastern White Pine)
 Pinus sylvestris (Scots Pine) - introduced

Platycladus
 Platycladus orientalis (Chinese Arborvitae) (previously known as Thuja orientalis) - introduced

Pseudotsuga
 Pseudotsuga menziesii subsp. menziesii (Coast Douglas-fir)
 Pseudotsuga menziesii subsp. glauca (Rocky Mountain Douglas-fir)

Sciadopitys
 Sciadopitys verticillata (Umbrella-pine) - introduced

Sequoia
 Sequoia sempervirens (Coast Redwood) - introduced

Sequoiadendron
 Sequoiadendron giganteum (Giant Sequoia) - introduced

Taxodium (cypresses)
 Taxodium distichum (Baldcypress) - introduced

Taxus (yews)
 Taxus baccata (English Yew) - introduced
 Taxus brevifolia (Western Yew) 
 Taxus canadensis (Canada Yew)
 Taxus cuspidata (Japanese Yew) - introduced

Thuja (thujas)
 Thuja occidentalis (Eastern Arborvitae)
 Thuja plicata (Western Redcedar)

Tsuga (hemlocks)
 Tsuga canadensis (Eastern Hemlock)
 Tsuga heterophylla (Western Hemlock)
 Tsuga mertensiana (Mountain Hemlock)

Xanthocyparis
 Xanthocyparis nootkatensis (Nootka Cypress, Yellow-cedar) (previously included in Chamaecyparis)

Ginkgophyta (Ginkgos)
Ginkgo
 Ginkgo biloba (Ginkgo) - introduced

Magnoliophyta (Broadleaves)
Acer (maples)
 Acer circinatum (Vine maple)
 Acer × freemanii (Freeman's maple) (hybrid red maple × silver maple)
 Acer ginnala (Amur maple) - introduced
 Acer glabrum (Douglas maple)
 Acer macrophyllum (Bigleaf maple)
 Acer negundo (Manitoba maple or boxelder)
 Acer nigrum (Black maple)
 Acer palmatum (Japanese maple) - introduced
 Acer pensylvanicum (Striped maple)
 Acer platanoides (Norway maple) - introduced
 Acer pseudoplatanus (Sycamore maple) - introduced
 Acer rubrum (Red maple)
 Acer saccharinum (Silver maple)
 Acer saccharum (Sugar maple)
 Acer spicatum (Mountain maple)

Aesculus (buckeyes and horse-chestnuts)
 Aesculus × carnea (Red Horse-chestnut) - introduced
 Aesculus glabra (Ohio Buckeye)
 Aesculus hippocastanum (Common Horse-chestnut) - introduced

Ailanthus
 Ailanthus altissima (Ailanthus) - introduced

Alnus (alders)
 Alnus glutinosa (Black alder) - introduced
 Alnus incana (Speckled alder)
 Alnus rubra (Red alder)
 Alnus serrulata (Hazel alder)
 Alnus viridis (Green alder)

Amelanchier (serviceberries)
 Amelanchier alnifolia (Juneberry or Saskatoon berry)
 Amelanchier arborea (Downy serviceberry)
 Amelanchier bartramiana (Mountain serviceberry)
 Amelanchier florida (Pacific serviceberry)
 Amelanchier laevis (Smooth serviceberry)
 Amelanchier sanguinea (Roundleaf serviceberry)

Aralia
 Aralia elata (Japanese angelica-tree) - introduced

Arbutus
 Arbutus menziesii (Pacific Madrone)

Asimina
 Asimina triloba (Pawpaw)

Betula (birches)
 Betula alleghaniensis (Yellow Birch)
 Betula cordifolia (Mountain Paper Birch)
 Betula kenaica (Kenai Paper Birch)
 Betula lenta (Cherry Birch)
 Betula neoalaskana (Alaska Paper Birch)
 Betula occidentalis (Water Birch)
 Betula papyrifera (Paper Birch)
 Betula pendula (Silver Birch) - introduced
 Betula populifolia (Gray Birch)

Caragana
 Caragana arborescens (Siberian pea-tree) - introduced

Carpinus (hornbeams)
 Carpinus betulus (European Hornbeam) - introduced
 Carpinus caroliniana (American Hornbeam)

Carya (hickories)
 Carya cordiformis (Bitternut Hickory)
 Carya glabra (Pignut Hickory)
 Carya laciniosa (Shellbark Hickory)
 Carya ovata (Shagbark Hickory)

Castanea (chestnuts)
 Castanea dentata (American Chestnut)
 Castanea mollissima (Chinese Chestnut) - introduced

Catalpa (catalpas)
 Catalpa bignonioides (Southern catalpa) - introduced
 Catalpa ovata (Japanese catalpa) - introduced
 Catalpa speciosa (Northern catalpa) - introduced

Celtis (hackberries)
 Celtis occidentalis (Hackberry)
 Celtis tenuifolia (Dwarf hackberry)

Cephalanthus
 Cephalanthus occidentalis (Button-bush))

Cercidiphyllum
 Cercidiphyllum japonicum (Katsura-tree) - introduced

Cercis
 Cercis canadensis (Redbud)

Cladrastis
 Cladrastis kentukea (Yellow-wood) - introduced

Cornus (dogwoods)
 Cornus alternifolia (Alternate-leaved dogwood)
 Cornus florida (Flowering Dogwood)
 Cornus kousa (Kousa Dogwood) - introduced
 Cornus mas (European Cornel) - introduced
 Cornus nuttallii (Pacific Dogwood)

Corylus (hazels )
 Corylus americana (American Hazel)
 Corylus avellana (Common hazel) - introduced
 Corylus colurna (Turkish Hazel) - introduced
 Corylus cornuta (Beaked Hazel)
 Corylus maxima (Filbert) - introduced

Cotinus
 Cotinus coggygria (Smokebush) - introduced

Crataegus (Hawthorns) - too many species to list.

Elaeagnus
 Elaeagnus angustifolia (Russian-olive) - introduced
 Elaeagnus commutata (Silverberry)

Euonymus (Euonymus)
 Euonymus alatus (Winged euonymus) - introduced
 Euonymus atropurpureus (Burning-bush) euonymus
 Euonymus europaeus (European spindle) - introduced
 Euonymus fortunei (Winter-creeper euonymus) - introduced

Fagus (beeches)
 Fagus grandifolia (American Beech)
 Fagus sylvatica (European Beech) - introduced

Fraxinus (ashes)
 Fraxinus americana (White Ash)
 Fraxinus excelsior (European Ash) - introduced
 Fraxinus latifolia (Oregon Ash)
 Fraxinus nigra (Black Ash)
 Fraxinus pennsylvanica (Green Ash)
 Fraxinus profunda (Pumpkin Ash)
 Fraxinus quadrangulata (Blue Ash)

Gleditsia
 Gleditsia triacanthos (Honey-locust)

Gymnocladus
 Gymnocladus dioicus (Kentucky coffee-tree)

Hamamelis
 Hamamelis virginiana (Witch-hazel)

Hippophae
 Hippophae rhamnoides (Sea-buckthorn) - introduced

Ilex (hollies)
 Ilex aquifolium (English Holly) - introduced
 Ilex mucronata (Mountain Holly; syn. Nemopanthus mucronatus)
 Ilex opaca (American Holly) - introduced
 Ilex verticillata (Common Winterberry)

Juglans (walnuts)
 Juglans cinerea (Butternut)
 Juglans nigra (Black Walnut)
 Juglans regia (Persian Walnut) - introduced

Laburnum
 Laburnum anagyroides (Laburnum) - introduced

Liquidambar
 Liquidambar styraciflua (Sweetgum) - introduced

Liriodendron
 Liriodendron tulipifera (Tulip tree)

Maclura
 Maclura pomifera (Osage-orange) - introduced

Magnolia (magnolias)
 Magnolia acuminata (Cucumber tree)
 Magnolia × soulangeana (Saucer magnolia) - introduced

Malus (apples)
 Malus baccata (Siberian crab apple) - introduced
 Malus coronaria (Wild crab apple)
 Malus fusca (Pacific crab apple)
 Malus sylvestris (Common apple) - introduced

Morus (mulberries)
 Morus alba (White Mulberry) - introduced
 Morus rubra (Red Mulberry)

Myrica
 Myrica californica (Pacific bayberry)

Nemopanthus – see Ilex

Nyssa (tupelos)
 Nyssa sylvatica (Black tupelo)

Ostrya
 Ostrya virginiana (American hornbeam or Ironwood)

Phellodendron
 Phellodendron amurense (Amur cork-tree) - introduced

Platanus (planes)
 Platanus × acerifolia (London plane) - introduced
 Platanus occidentalis (American sycamore)

Populus (poplars, balsam poplars, aspens, cottonwoods)
 Populus × acuminata (Lanceleaf cottonwood)
 Populus alba (White Poplar) - introduced
 Populus angustifolia (Narrowleaf cottonwood)
 Populus balsamifera (Eastern Balsam Poplar)
 Populus × canadensis (Carolina poplar) - introduced
 Populus deltoides (Eastern Cottonwood)
 Populus grandidentata (Bigtooth Aspen)
 Populus heterophylla (Swamp cottonwood)
 Populus × jackii (Jack's hybrid poplar)
 Populus nigra (Black Poplar, Lombardy poplar) - introduced
 Populus simonii (Simon's poplar) - introduced
 Populus tremuloides (Trembling Aspen)
 Populus trichocarpa (Black Cottonwood)

Prunus (cherries, plums, peaches)
 Prunus americana (American plum)
 Prunus armeniaca (Apricot) - introduced
 Prunus avium (Sweet cherry) - introduced
 Prunus cerasus (Sour cherry) - introduced
 Prunus emarginata (Bitter cherry)
 Prunus maackii (Amur chokecherry) - introduced
 Prunus nigra (Canada plum)
 Prunus pensylvanica (Pin cherry)
 Prunus serotina (Black cherry)
 Prunus serrulata (Japanese flowering cherry) - introduced
 Prunus virginiana (Chokecherry)

Ptelea
 Ptelea trifoliata (Hoptree)

Pyrus (pears)
 Pyrus communis (Common pear)

Quercus (oaks)
 Quercus alba (White oak)
 Quercus bicolor (Swamp white oak)
 Quercus coccinea (Scarlet oak)
 Quercus ellipsoidalis (Northern pin oak)
 Quercus garryana (Garry oak)
 Quercus ilicifolia (Bear oak)
 Quercus imbricaria (Shingle oak)
 Quercus macrocarpa (Bur oak)
 Quercus montana (Chestnut oak)
 Quercus muehlenbergii (Chinquapin oak)
 Quercus palustris (Pin oak)
 Quercus prinoides (Dwarf chinquapin oak)
 Quercus robur (English oak) - introduced
 Quercus rubra (Northern red oak)
 Quercus shumardii (Shumard oak)
 Quercus velutina (Black oak)

Rhamnus (buckthorns)
 Rhamnus cathartica (European buckthorn) - introduced
 Rhamnus frangula (Glossy buckthorn) - introduced
 Rhamnus purshiana (Cascara buckthorn)

Rhododendron (rhododendrons)
 Rhododendron macrophyllum (Pacific rhododendron)
 Rhododendron maximum (Rosebay rhododendron) - introduced
 Rhododendron ponticum (Pontic rhododendron) - introduced

Rhus (sumacs)
 Rhus copallina (Shining sumac)
 Rhus glabra (Smooth sumac)
 Rhus typhina (Staghorn sumac)

Robinia
 Robinia pseudoacacia (Black locust) - introduced

Sassafras
 Sassafras albidum (Sassafras)

Salix (willows) - too many species to list.

Sambucus (elder)
 Sambucus callicarpa (Red-berry elder)
 Sambucus canadensis (American elder)
 Sambucus cerulea (Blue-berry elder)
 Sambucus melanocarpa (Black-berry elder)
 Sambucus pubens (Eastern red-berry elder)

Shepherdia
 Shepherdia argentea (Silver buffalo-berry)

Sorbus (rowans)
 Sorbus americana (American Rowan or mountain-ash)
 Sorbus aucuparia (European rowan) - introduced
 Sorbus decora (Showy Rowan or mountain-ash)
 Sorbus sitchensis (Sitka Rowan or mountain-ash)

Syringa
 Syringa vulgaris (Common lilac)

Tilia (lindens)
 Tilia americana (Basswood)
 Tilia cordata (Little-leaf linden) - introduced
 Tilia tomentosa (Silver linden) - introduced

Toxicodendron
 Toxicodendron vernix (Poison-sumac)

Ulmus (elms)
 Ulmus americana (American elm or White elm)
 Ulmus glabra (Wych elm) - introduced
 Ulmus procera (English elm) - introduced
 Ulmus pumila (Siberian elm) - introduced
 Ulmus rubra (Slippery elm)
 Ulmus thomasii (Rock elm)

Viburnum (viburnums)
 Viburnum edule (Squashberry)
 Viburnum lantana (Wayfaring-tree) - introduced
 Viburnum lentago (Sweet viburnum, nannyberry)
 Viburnum opulus (Wayfaring tree) - introduced
 Viburnum trilobum (Highbush cranberry)

Zanthoxylum (Zanthoxylums, prickly-ashes)
 Zanthoxylum americanum (Common prickly-ash)
 Zanthoxylum clava-herculis (Southern prickly-ash)

Zelkova
 Zelkova serrata (Japanese zelkova) - introduced

Natural history of Canada
Canada
 
List of trees|Canada

Lists of biota of Canada